Yvonne Balding ( Barr; 11 March 1932 – 13 February 2016) was an Irish-born virologist who co-discovered the Epstein–Barr virus in 1964.

Education and career
Barr was born in Ireland and graduated with honours in zoology from Trinity College, Dublin. Following her graduation Barr held several posts at veterinary and medical research laboratories in the UK and Canada. In 1963 Barr was the first of two research assistants employed by the English pathologist and virologist Michael Anthony Epstein, who had received a research grant from the National Institutes of Health (NIH).

Barr, along with her research supervisor Epstein, discovered the Epstein–Barr virus (EBV) during her PhD studies in 1964 at Middlesex Hospital. Prior to determining specifics about EBV, Epstein, Barr, and Bert Achong published their preliminary research in The Lancet. Barr was instrumental in the discovery of the Epstein-Barr virus, also called human herpesvirus 4, by preparing the samples used for experimentation.

She joined the team at the Bland Sutton Institute of Pathology of Middlesex Hospital Medical School, University of London in 1963. Barr graduated from the University of London in 1966 with a PhD.

Personal life 
Upon moving to Melbourne, she married Stuart Balding and had two children. Barr died in Melbourne, Australia at the age of 83.

External links 
 Yvonne Barr's video greeting at the EBV 50th anniversary conference in 2014

References 

1932 births
2016 deaths
Alumni of Trinity College Dublin
Alumni of the University of London
Irish virologists
British virologists
Women virologists
20th-century British women scientists
British women biologists
20th-century British biologists
British emigrants to Australia
Australian virologists